The 2017 Prairie View A&M Panthers football team represented Prairie View A&M University in the 2017 NCAA Division I FCS football season. The Panthers were led by third-year head coach Willie Simmons and played their home games at Panther Stadium at Blackshear Field in Prairie View, Texas as members of the West Division of the Southwestern Athletic Conference (SWAC). The Panthers finished the season 6–5, 4–3 in SWAC play to finish in third place in the West Division.

On December 9, head coach Willie Simmons resigned to become the head coach at Florida A&M He finished at PVA&M with a three-year record of 21–11.

Preseason 
The Panthers were picked to finish in third place in the West Division.

Schedule

References

Prairie View AandM
Prairie View A&M Panthers football seasons
Prairie View AandM Panthers football